Wings in the Dark is a 1935 film directed by James Flood and starring Myrna Loy and Cary Grant and focusing on a daring woman aviator and an inventor thrust into a desperate situation. Wings in the Dark was produced by Arthur Hornblow, Jr. The film was the first that Loy and Grant made together, although Loy's biographer Emily Leider says that Wings in the Dark "wastes their talents and prompts an unintentional laugh fest." The film remains notable as a rare movie depiction of a blind protagonist (played by Grant) during the 1930s, and is also known for its accomplished aerial photography directed by Dewey Wrigley.

Plot

Skywriter and stunt pilot Sheila Mason (Myrna Loy) who has to work as a barnstormer because women were not allowed in other aviation fields, is attracted to ace pilot Ken Gordon (Cary Grant). Ken is trying to perfect instrument flying (flying "blind"), with his own design of an autopilot. He has devoted four years to perfecting the system and even mortgaged his aircraft to finance his experiments. Before being able to prove his invention works, a stove accident blinds him. The doctors cannot say for how long.

When Ken retreats from the world, Mac (Hobart Cavanaugh), his friend and partner, brings him Lightning, a seeing eye dog. He first resists any efforts to help him, but with the help of his dog, he learns to navigate around his household and soon keeps busy by writing aviation articles. Sheila, who has fallen in love with Ken, does not tell him that the articles are all being rejected. She gives him money to survive by taking on dangerous stunts arranged by her manager, Nick Williams (Roscoe Karns).

Ken finally regains his confidence and continues to work on his autopilot when the Rockwell Aviation Company, based at Roosevelt Field near New York, repossesses his aircraft. Distraught, Ken accuses Sheila of falling for him out of pity and sends her away. She plans a solo flight from  Moscow to New York to win a $25,000 prize so they can marry.

Her last stage from Boston to New York finds Sheila nearly out of fuel and running into bad weather. She navigates by looking down to see where she is, but over Roosevelt Field, the fog is so heavy that she may not be able to land. With help from Mac, Ken sneaks into his old aircraft and takes off, using his autopilot to help Sheila land. While in the air, Ken talks to Sheila about his desperation of being blind and not having any future. His intention is to bring her to the ground and then fly until he runs out of fuel and crashes. Sheila tries to dissuade him, but he is determined. The two pilots make it down, but Sheila deliberately crashes into Ken's aircraft to make sure that he will not try to kill himself.

A huge crowd has gathered at the airport. As the two greet the public and the press, Ken sees flashes of light from the exploding flash bulbs of the photographers. Ken and Sheila embrace as their car continues through the throng of well-wishers.

Cast

 Myrna Loy as Sheila Mason
 Cary Grant as Ken Gordon
 Roscoe Karns as Nick Williams
 Hobart Cavanaugh as Mac
 Dean Jagger as Top Harmon
 Russell Hopton as Jake Brashear
 Matt McHugh as 1st Mechanic
 Graham McNamee as Radio Announcer
 Lightning the dog

Production
Principal photography for Wings in the Dark began on October 22, 1934. Captain Earl H. Robinson was the technical advisor on the film and adapted the screenplay with Dale Van Every. Amelia Earhart also visited the set as a consultant. Ken Gordon's aircraft is a Lockheed Model 8 Sirius; other aircraft include a Travel Air B 4000, flown by Sheila Mason, and a Lockheed Vega 5B.

Reception
In his review for The New York Times, film critic Andre Sennwald described the film as "... a pleasantly performed and skillfully filmed melodrama of the peacetime airways which is hampered by an addle-pated narrative. High altitudes have a tendency to make scenarists just a trifle giddy, with the result that the big climax of the Paramount's new photoplay has the appearance of having been composed during a tail spin."

Nell Shipman, one of the writers of the original story "Eyes of the Eagle", which pivoted upon a fictionalized version of Amelia Earhart, whom Shipman knew personally, was extremely disappointed by Myrna Loy's performance and the diminishing of the seeing eye dog as one of the main characters.  Graham Greene called the film "as sentimental as it is improbable," but "... as exciting as it is naive."

Aviation historians consider Wings in the Dark one of a number of poorly done aviation films made during the early part of the Depression.

References

Notes

Citations

Bibliography

 Dwiggins, Don. Hollywood Pilot: The Biography of Paul Mantz. Garden City, New York: Doubleday & Company, Inc., 1967.
 Greene, Graham and David Parkinson. Mornings in the Dark: The Graham Greene Film Reader. Manchester, UK: Carcanet Press, 1993. .
 Harrison, James P. Mastering the Sky: A History of Aviation from Ancient Times to the Present. New York: Da Capo Press, 2000. . 
 Leider, Emily W. Myrna Loy: The Only Good Girl in Hollywood. Oakland, California: University of California Press, 2011. . 
 Mandell, Deena. Deadbeat Dads: Subjectivity and Social Construction. Toronto, Ontario, Canada: University of Toronto Press, 2002. .
 Young, William H. and Nancy K. Young. The Great Depression in America: A Cultural Encyclopedia. Santa Barbara, California: Greenwood Publishing Group, 2007. .

External links
 
 

American aviation films
American romantic drama films
Films about blind people
Films directed by James Flood
Paramount Pictures films

American black-and-white films
1935 romantic drama films
1935 films
1930s English-language films
1930s American films
Films about disability